Major General Susan Yvonne Desjardins is a retired major general in the United States Air Force.  She last served as director of plans and policy (J5), Headquarters U.S. Strategic Command, Offutt Air Force Base, Neb.

Military career
Raised in Portsmouth, New Hampshire, Desjardins graduated from the United States Air Force Academy in 1980.  She holds a master's degree in industrial psychology from Louisiana Tech University, and a master's degree in national security and strategic studies from the Naval Command and Staff College.  She graduated from the Air War College at Maxwell Air Force Base, Alabama, in 1997 and from the General Manager Program at the Harvard Business School, Harvard University in 2004.

Desjardins has held a variety of staff positions at the major command, Joint Staff and Headquarters U.S. Air Force levels, including deputy military assistant to the Secretary of the Air Force.  Her previous command positions have included the 23rd Commandant of the Air Force Academy and 1st female commandant, Colorado Springs, Colorado, 912th Air Refueling Squadron, Grand Forks Air Force Base, North Dakota; the 60th Operations Group, Travis Air Force Base, California, and the 437th Airlift Wing at Charleston Air Force Base, South Carolina.  Desjardins is a command pilot with more than 3,800 flying hours in the KC-10, C-17, C-5 Galaxy, KC-135R, KC-135A and T-37.

Education
1980 Bachelor of Science degree in international affairs/political science, U.S. Air Force Academy, Colorado Springs, Colorado
1983 Squadron Officer School, by correspondence
1991 Master of Arts degree in industrial psychology and human relations, Louisiana Tech University
1993 Master of Arts degree in national security and strategic studies, Naval Command and Staff College, Naval War College, Newport, R.I.
1997 Air War College, Maxwell AFB, Ala.
2004 General Manager Program, Harvard Business School, Harvard University, Cambridge, Mass.
2009 National Security Studies Program, George Washington University, Washington, D.C.
2009 Air Force Enterprise Leadership Seminar, University of North Carolina at Chapel Hill

Assignments
July 1980 - August 1981, student, undergraduate pilot training, Laughlin AFB, Texas
August 1981 - December 1981, KC-135A pilot training, Castle AFB, Calif.
December 1981 - October 1985, KC-135A copilot, standardization and evaluation copilot, and aircraft commander, 911th Air Refueling Squadron, Seymour Johnson AFB, N.C.
October 1985 - September 1988, KC-10 copilot and aircraft commander, 344th Air Refueling Squadron, Seymour Johnson AFB, N.C.
September 1988 - July 1991, KC-10 instructor and evaluator pilot, 2nd Air Refueling Squadron; later, executive officer, 2nd Bombardment Wing, Barksdale AFB, La.
July 1991 - August 1992, KC-10 program element monitor, Directorate for Requirements and Test, Headquarters Strategic Air Command, Offutt AFB, Neb.
August 1992 - July 1993, student, Naval Command and Staff College, Newport R.I.
July 1993 - March 1994, tanker requirements staff officer, Deputy Chief of Staff for Plans and Operations, Headquarters U.S. Air Force, Washington, D.C.
March 1994 - March 1995, member, Air Force Issues Team, Deputy Chief of Staff for Plans and Operations, Headquarters U.S. Air Force, Washington, D.C.
March 1995 - July 1996, deputy military assistant to the Secretary of the Air Force, Headquarters U.S. Air Force, Washington, D.C.
July 1996 - July 1997, student, Air War College, Maxwell AFB, Ala.
July 1997 - August 1999, Commander, 912th Air Refueling Squadron, Grand Forks AFB, N.D.
August 1999 - March 2002, strategic planner, later, Chief, Nuclear Treaties Branch, Directorate for Strategic Plans and Policy (J5), Joint Staff, the Pentagon, Washington, D.C.
March 2002 - August 2003, Commander, 60th Operations Group, Travis AFB, Calif.
August 2003 - October 2004, executive officer to the Commander, U.S. Transportation Command, and the Commander, Air Mobility Command, Scott AFB, Ill.
October 2004 - November 2005, Commander, 437th Airlift Wing, Charleston AFB, S.C.
December 2005 - October 2008, Commandant of Cadets, U.S. Air Force Academy, Colorado Springs, Colo.
October 2008 - January 2011, Deputy Director then Director of Strategic Plans, Requirements and Programs, Headquarters Air Mobility Command, Scott AFB, Ill.
January 2011 – October 2012, director of plans and policy (J5), U.S. Strategic Command, Offutt AFB, Neb.

Flight information
Rating: Command pilot
Flight hours: More than 3,800
Aircraft flown: KC-10, C-17, C-5, KC-135R, KC-135A and T-37

Awards and decorations

Effective dates of promotion

References

Year of birth missing (living people)
Living people
People from Portsmouth, New Hampshire
United States Air Force Academy alumni
Louisiana Tech University alumni
College of Naval Command and Staff alumni
Harvard Business School alumni
Female generals of the United States Air Force
United States Air Force personnel of the Gulf War
Recipients of the Legion of Merit
Recipients of the Defense Superior Service Medal
Recipients of the Air Force Distinguished Service Medal
20th-century American women
21st-century American women